Kenneth Sunquist is the Assistant Deputy Minister of the Global Operations Branch and Chief Trade Commissioner at Foreign Affairs and International Trade Canada. Sunquist previously served as the Canadian ambassador to Indonesia. He was born in Regina, Saskatchewan, and graduated from the University of Saskatchewan in 1970 with a bachelor's degree in business administration.
Sunquist is on the board of directors of the Canadian Commercial Corporation, and serves on its Human Resources Board Committee.

Foreign assignments
Jakarta, Indonesia
Beijing, China
Seoul, South Korea.
Belgrade, Serbia
San Francisco, United States
Kingston, Jamaica

Domestic assignments
Assistant Deputy Minister, Global Operations Branch & Chief Trade Commissioner
Assistant Deputy Minister, World Markets Branch
Assistant Deputy Minister, International Business and Chief Trade Commissioner
Director General, Trade Commissioner Service Operations and Services
Co-ordinator of the Trade Development Policy Secretariat
Director of the Trade Development Liaison and Special Projects Division
Acting Director General of the Trade Communications Bureau

References

External links
Award of Excellence from Treasury Board of Canada, June 1997
Embassy Magazine: Canada's New Trade Tactics
Doing business in Canada
Canadian Help for East Timor, Maclean's Magazine

Year of birth missing (living people)
Living people
People from Regina, Saskatchewan
Ambassadors of Canada to Indonesia